Zlatar is a South-Slavic toponym and personal name meaning goldsmith. It may refer to:

Zlatar Lake, a lake in Serbia (Zlatarsko Jezero)
Zlatar (mountain), a mountain in southwest Serbia
 Zlatar, Croatia, a town in northern Croatia
 Zlătar, members of a Romani Boyash community